A number of steamships were named Adamsturm, including:

, a cargo ship in service 1909–17
, a Hansa A Type cargo ship in service 1944–45

Ship names